Waqt Ki Pukar is a 1984 Hindi film starring Raj Kiran, Shoma Anand, Vijayendra Ghatge, Yogeeta Bali, Ranjeet and Madan Puri.

Soundtrack
The music of the film was composed by Bappi Lahiri and lyrics by Gauhar Kanpuri.

References

External links

1984 films
1980s Hindi-language films
Films scored by Bappi Lahiri